Events in the year 1944 in Bulgaria.

Incumbents 
Monarch – Simeon II
Regency council

Events 

 August 26 – Bulgaria officially withdraws from World War II.

References 

 
1940s in Bulgaria
Years of the 20th century in Bulgaria
Bulgaria
Bulgaria